Albert Leroy "Moose" Marshall (born November 22, 1943) is a Canadian former professional ice hockey defenceman who played in the National Hockey League for the Detroit Red Wings, Oakland Seals/California Golden Seals, New York Rangers and New York Islanders.

Playing career
Marshall was a rugged, stay-at-home defenceman who could also provide crisp outlet passes to his forwards. In his rookie season with the Detroit Red Wings, his fine play made him a contender for the Calder Memorial Trophy. The Red Wings made the finals that season before Montreal defeated them four games to two.

Detroit slumped in 1967–68 and traded Marshall, with Ted Hampson, to the Oakland Seals for defenceman Kent Douglas. The Seals finished second in 1968–69 and fourth in 1969–70 in the West Division of the NHL, and Marshall's fine play was part of the reason. The Oakland Seals became the California Golden Seals in 1970–71, and Marshall was injured much of the year, which contributed to the Seals' last place finish.

Marshall was traded to the New York Rangers in 1972–73, but only played eight games. He was drafted by the New York Islanders in the 1973 intra-league draft and it was here that he played his best hockey. He developed good shot-blocking ability and his reliable play and leadership helped the Islanders make the Stanley Cup semi-finals in 1975 and 1976.

Marshall's skating began to decline in 1978–79. He announced his retirement as an active player on June 12, 1979. He later coached minor league hockey before coaching the NHL's Colorado Rockies for 24 games in 1981–82 before he was fired and replaced by Marshall Johnston.

Marshall now lives in Poulsbo, Washington, and currently is an amateur scout for the Carolina Hurricanes. He won the Stanley Cup with Carolina in 2006. On January 7, 2017, he was selected to drop the ceremonial first puck at the San Jose Sharks game vs. the Detroit Red Wings when the Sharks honored the Golden Seals.

Career statistics

Coaching record

References

External links 

1943 births
Living people
California Golden Seals players
Carolina Hurricanes scouts
Cincinnati Wings players
Colorado Rockies (NHL) coaches
Detroit Red Wings players
Edmonton Oil Kings (WCHL) players
Hartford Whalers scouts
Ice hockey people from British Columbia
New York Islanders players
New York Islanders scouts
New York Rangers players
Oakland Seals players
Pittsburgh Hornets players
Sportspeople from Kamloops
Stanley Cup champions
Canadian ice hockey defencemen
Canadian ice hockey coaches